Drinking from the Sun is the sixth studio album by Australian hip hop group the Hilltop Hoods. The album was released on 9 March 2012. The album's first single, "I Love It", was released on 25 November 2011, and features vocals from fellow South Australian and Adelaide-born singer-songwriter Sia. The album debuted at number one on the Australian Albums Chart reaching gold status on its first day, making it Hilltop Hood's third consecutive chart-topping album. The album is certified double platinum in Australia. It received four nominations at the ARIA Music Awards of 2012, becoming the group's fourth consecutive release and third consecutive studio album to win Best Urban Album.

Background 
Not many details were released about the album. Suffa, in an interview with Tom & Alex of Triple j, briefly talked about the album, saying:

The album's first single "I Love It", which features fellow South Australian Sia, was released on 25 November 2011.

On 24 January 2012, the band leaked the song "Rattling the Keys to the Kingdom" from the album.

On 6 February 2012, the track listing was confirmed on the band's Tumblr page.

On 17 April, the group released the second single Speaking in Tongues, along with its music video, which features animated graffiti effects.

On 10 July, the video premier for the new single Shredding the Balloon was shown on V Music and Channel V. The single itself was released on 20 July 2012.

On 20 September, the 4th single Rattling the Keys to the Kingdom was released. The video features the group, and many other Australian Hip-Hop artists. The Hoods stated that they wanted to do something different, yet unifying at the same time. The film clip illustrates how far Hip-Hop has come in Australia in the last 10–20 years from something unheard of to being a whole new popular genre.

Content
The album is features the three-part "The Thirst" as the opening, tenth and final tracks, all featuring the same instrumental. Part 1 features a sole verse from MC Pressure about the groups return following 2009's multi-platinum State of the Art. Part 2 features samples of interviews with Pressure explaining the origins of the album title, whilst Part 3 features a verse from Suffa and contains a sample of a voice stating that the group 'were recording enough music for two albums. That was pre-meditated'.

Notable guest features on the album include Black Thought of The Roots on 'Living in Bunkers' and Chali 2na on Speaking in Tongues.

Track listing

Chart positions

Weekly charts

Year-end charts

Decade-end charts

Certifications

References

External links 
 HILLTOP HOODS

2012 albums
ARIA Award-winning albums
Hilltop Hoods albums
Golden Era Records albums